The Federalist ticket was announced only a week before the election, with no active campaigning.

See also 
 United States House of Representatives elections, 1804 and 1805
 List of United States representatives from New Jersey

1804
New Jersey
United States House of Representatives